Lewis Lovering Morgan (March 2, 1876 – June 10, 1950) was an American lawyer and politician from Covington, Louisiana. He served in the United States House of Representatives from November 5, 1912, to March 4, 1917, from Louisiana's 6th congressional district.

References
Lewis Lovering Morgan," A Dictionary of Louisiana Biography (1988), p. 582.
http://bioguide.congress.gov/scripts/biodisplay.pl?index=M000955
Who's Who in Louisiana and Mississippi (1918)
Morgan obituary, New Orleans Times-Picayune, June 11, 1950
Congressional Quarterly's Guide to U.S. Elections, Gubernatorial primaries, 1944

1876 births
1950 deaths
American Episcopalians
Politicians from New Orleans
People from Mandeville, Louisiana
Democratic Party members of the Louisiana House of Representatives
Tulane University alumni
Tulane University Law School alumni
School board members in Louisiana
Lawyers from New Orleans
Burials in Louisiana
Democratic Party members of the United States House of Representatives from Louisiana